Oxeia is a Greek island in the Ionian Sea. , it had no resident population. It is the chief island in the southern group (the Ouniades) of the Echinades, part of the Ionian Islands. Oxeia possesses the highest point in the Echinades, . It is situated near the mouth of the river Acheloos, off the coast of Aetolia-Acarnania. The Battle of Lepanto took place near the island in 1571.

In April 2012, it was bought by Qatar Holdings.

References

External links
Oxeia on GTP Travel Pages (in English and Greek)

Uninhabited islands of Greece
Echinades
Private islands of Greece
Islands of the Ionian Islands (region)
Landforms of Ithaca